Mittell is a surname. Notable people with the surname include:

Jackie Mittell (1906-1976), Welsh professional footballer
Jason Mittell (born 1970), American professor
Lynn Mittell (born 1947), better known as Owen Money, Welsh musician, actor, comedian, and radio presenter

See also
Sybilla Mittell Weber (1892-1957), American artist
Mitchell (disambiguation)